Al-Muhtasib al-Mujahid Hamzah (died 2 November 1067) was an imam of the Zaidi state in Yemen who ruled from 1060 to 1067.

Hamzah was the son of the imam Abu Hashim al-Hasan, and assisted his father when he proclaimed his da'wa (call for the imamate) in 1031. After the death of imam Abu'l-Fath an-Nasir ad-Dailami in 1053 at the battle of Najd-al-Jah, no new imam appeared for some time. Much of Yemen was dominated by the powerful Sulayhid king Ali as-Sulayhi, who ruled San'a and the land south of it by 1063. In the northern highland, the Zaidis attempted to stall the Sulayhid advance. Hamzah became imam in 1060, being known by the title al-Muhtasib al-Mujahid Hamzah. The title muhtasib meant that he was only imam in the sense of protector of the community, but was not entitled to lead the public prayers or pass legal sentences. His chance seemed to come in 1067, when Ali as-Sulayhi was assaulted and killed by the Najahid ruler Sa'id bin Najah from Zabid. Al-Muhtasib al-Mujahid Hamzah immediately grabbed the opportunity and attacked San'a with 500 cavalry and 15,000 infantry, mainly tribesmen of Hamdan. The attack was however met by the loyal Sulayhid commander Amir az-Zawahi. When the imam and his followers had reached al-Malwa, the Sulayhid forces gave battle on 2 November 1067. The imam was defeated and killed together with one of his sons. A Zaidi clan, the Hamzite Sharifs, was descended from him. His demise was followed by an extended period of 72 years when no Zaidi imam was appointed.

See also

 History of Yemen
 Imams of Yemen
 Rassids

References

Further reading 

 Robert W. Stookey, Yemen; The Politics of the Yemen Arab Republic. Boulder 1978.

11th century in Yemen
Zaydi imams of Yemen
1067 deaths
Year of birth unknown
11th-century Arabs
Rassid dynasty